Michael Quigley  (born 1953) is an Australian telecommunication business executive. He was the first Chief Executive Officer of NBN Co.

Career
He studied at the University of New South Wales where he received a Bachelor of Science and Bachelor of Engineering (Hons 1).

From 1971 to 2007 he worked for Alcatel, including the position of COO for the company's American arm. At Alcatel Australia he was responsible for Alcatel’s business in Australia and New Zealand and established an early focus on research and development and technical management.
At Alcatel USA he was  Chief Operating Officer in USA,  President and Chief Executive Officer of Alcatel’s Fixed Communications Group in Paris.
He was  President responsible for infrastructure products, including network switches and optical communications systems.
He was Alcatel's Chief Operating Officer.

From 24 July 2009 to 3 October 2013 he was Chief Executive Officer of NBN Co Limited.

He was a board member of Alliance for Telecommunications Industry Solutions (ATIS).

NBN
In June 2010 he would donate $2 million  to Neuroscience Research Australia (NeuRA), which will use the NBN to deliver remote rehabilitation therapy to stroke patients via the Nintendo Wii game console. Two million dollars is approximately equivalent to the NBN CEO's first year salary.

Mike Quigley announced in July 2013 that he would retire from NBN Co, staying on until a new CEO was found. He departed on 3 October 2013, replaced by former OPTUS & Telstra CEO Ziggy Switkowski as Executive Chairman (and Interim CEO) with immediate effect.

In December 2013, Telsoc (formerly ATUG), the Australian Society for Telecommunications & Digital Communications, awarded their "Charles Todd Medal" for Excellence in Telecommunications to Michael Malone and Mike Quigley. Quigley's acceptance speech at Telsoc.

In 2015 Quigley, as past CEO of NBN Co, publicly attacked the NBN and the MTM, noting cost blowouts and delays that he said were the fault of changes made by the Coalition government to the rollout plan.

Other roles
Quigley is director of the Prince of Wales Medical Research Institute.

Honours
In 2022, Quigley was appointed Member of the Order of Australia in the 2022 Queen's Birthday Honours for "significant service to the telecommunications sector, and to education".

References

1953 births
Living people
Australian businesspeople
Members of the Order of Australia
NBN Co people
People from Chatham, Kent